Leonard John Casey MBE (24 May 1931 – July 2022) was an English footballer who played as a wing half.

He played non-league football for Barking, playing in the Amateur Cup semi-final, before leaving to undertake his National Service.

On his return in 1952, he joined Leyton before joining  Chelsea in 1954. He spent four years at Stamford Bridge, making 34 league appearances. Casey was transferred to Plymouth Argyle in 1958 and made 24 appearances in the club's Third Division title winning campaign. He made 20 appearances in the Second Division the following season, but his last two seasons with the club were blighted by injury, with his only two appearances coming in the League Cup, ten months apart. He retired in 1961, having made 48 appearances in all competitions for Argyle.

Casey died in July 2022, at the age of 91. Prior to his death, he was the oldest living former Chelsea player.

Honours
Plymouth Argyle
Football League Third Division: 1958–59.

Individual
Casey was appointed a Member of the Order of the British Empire (MBE) in the 1993 Birthday Honours "for services to training", in recognition of his post-football career as Training Officer at Telephone Cables Ltd.

References

1931 births
2022 deaths
Members of the Order of the British Empire
English footballers
Footballers from the London Borough of Hackney
Association football midfielders
English Football League players
Leyton F.C. players
Chelsea F.C. players
Plymouth Argyle F.C. players